Nesrine is a given name. Notable people with the name include:

Nesrine Ben Kahia (born 1986), Tunisian table tennis player
Nesrine Daoula (born 1990), Tunisian handball player
Nesrine Hamza (born 1993), Tunisian handball player
Nesrine Merouane (born 1995), Algerian volleyball player